Shoshanna Lonstein-Gruss (born May 29, 1975) is an American writer and fashion designer and the founder and creative director of the fashion label Shoshanna, which was launched in 1998.

Early life
Shoshanna Lonstein was born and raised in Manhattan, New York, to a Jewish family. She attended Nightingale-Bamford School for girls in New York City's Upper East Side, graduating in 1993. While still a 17-year-old high school student, she met then 38-year-old Jerry Seinfeld in a public park. At that point, Seinfeld got her phone number. Lonstein later came to public attention by dating Seinfeld, who was at the time starring in his eponymous sitcom. Early in their relationship, Spy Magazine referred to her as "a legal voter", since she had turned 18 by then. They dated for approximately four years, from 1993 to 1997, before the relationship ended. She transferred from GW to UCLA, in part to be with Seinfeld, and cited missing New York City and constant press coverage as reasons for the relationship ending.

Career
With a loan from her father, Zach Lonstein, chief executive officer of Infocrossing, she started her clothing company in 1998 with the mission to design a clothing line that appealed to different body types.

In 2013, Elizabeth Arden, Inc. named Gruss the brand's first-ever Style Director. In this new role, Gruss served as a spokesperson and adviser for the design label.

Television
Gruss has appeared in numerous television programs, webcasts, and interviews, including a 2008 episode of America's Next Top Model.

Personal life 

On May 10, 2003, Lonstein married Joshua Gruss, son of financier Martin D. Gruss and grandson of financier and philanthropist Joseph S. Gruss. Joshua Gruss is a partner at Gruss & Co., a private investment firm based in New York City, and CEO of Round Hill Music. They have three children: a daughter, Sienna, born in 2005 and who now models for her; and twins, Angelica and Joseph Colby, born in 2012. The pair divorced in 2014.

She lives on the Upper East Side of Manhattan with their children.

Philanthropy
Gruss is a trustee of Reform synagogue Temple Emanu-El of New York, and the Nightingale-Bamford School where she is also a member of their Alumnae Board Committee. Gruss was Vice Chairman of the associate committee of the Memorial Sloan-Kettering Cancer Center and its Children's Committee from 2012–2014.

References

External links
 

1975 births
Living people
20th-century American businesswomen
20th-century American businesspeople
20th-century American women artists
21st-century American businesswomen
21st-century American businesspeople
21st-century American women artists
American fashion designers
American women fashion designers
Artists from New York City
Businesspeople from New York City
Jewish American philanthropists
George Washington University alumni
Jewish fashion designers
Nightingale-Bamford School alumni
People from the Upper East Side
University of California, Los Angeles alumni